Muñecos de Papel is the first soundtrack album to the telenovela Alcanzar una estrella II, released in 1991. It includes the first opening song for the telenovela, "Estrella de Ilusion", performed by Zarabanda, as well as the second opening song "Muñeco de Papel", performed by the fictional band Muñecos de Papel (Sasha, Ricky Martin, Bibi Gaytan, Marisa de Lille, Pedro Fernández, Angelica Rivera and Erick Rubin). 

The album version of "Muñeco de Papel" is different from the one that served as the opening song for the telenovela; Bibi Gaytán and Erick Rubín were then signed to Melody and due to differences between the record companies, their voices - which can be heard in the TV version (Sasha at 0:01, Bibi 0:13, Erick 0:40, Ricky 0:47, Pedro 0:54, Angelica 1:53)- were replaced by Sasha and Alejandro Ibarra, respectively.

Despite the title, this record was not a full Muñecos de Papel album; instead, it served to promote songs from the band members' solo albums ("Siento", "Juego de Ajedrez", "Oro") as well as other Sony Music artists such as Garibaldi that were not even featured in the telenovela. Songs such as Chantal Andere's "Musculo", which was often used in the TV show, are not present in this album - Chantal was also under contract with Melody.

The third opening song "No quiero dejar de brillar" was included in the second album released for this telenovela, simply titled Alcanzar una Estrella II and released by Melody in mid-1991.

Track listing
 "Siento" - Sasha Sokol
 "Estrella de Ilusion" - Zarabanda
 "Fan-Piras" - Gerardo Garcia
 "Muñeco de Papel" - Artistas Varios 
 "Deja" - Gibrann
 "Para Llegar" - Angélica Rivera
 "Oro" - Pedro Fernández
 "Juego de Ajedrez" - Ricky Martin  
 "Enciendo Una Vela" - Marianne
 "Banana" - Garibaldi (group)
 "Harto de Extrañarte" - Alejandro Ibarra
 "Amiga" - Ulisses

Television soundtracks
1991 soundtrack albums